This is a list of firsts in Sweden.

Politics and government
 First Prime Minister: Louis De Geer: March 20, 1876 – April 19, 1880.
 First female minister of cabinet: Karin Kock (s), 1947
 First female leader of a Riksdag party: Karin Söder (c), 1985
 First female Prime Minister: Magdalena Andersson: 30 November 2021 – 18 October 2022.
 First openly homosexual minister of cabinet: Andreas Carlgren (c), 2006.
 First minister of cabinet of African origin: Nyamko Sabuni (fp), 2006.
 First speaker of the unicameral Riksdag: Henry Allard (s), 1971.

Architecture
 First planned settlement: Birka

Education and academia 
 First university: Uppsala University, founded in 1477, continuous since 1593.
 First female dentist: Rosalie Fougelberg, 1867 (Amalia Assur, was licensed in 1852, but only with a special permission) 
 First female medical doctor: Karolina Widerström, 1884 
 First female PhD: Ellen Fries, promoted in 1883
 First female professor: Sofia Kovalevskaya, 1889  
 First female university student: Betty Pettersson, 1872
 First (trained) nurse: Emmy Rappe, 1867
 First female pharmacist: Agnes Arvidsson, 1903 (First female with a degree in pharmacology)
 First female psychiatrist: Alfhild Tamm, 1908

Science and technology

 First scientific discovery: Lymphatic system by Olaus Rudbeck.
 First elephant: Imported from Ceylon in 1804.
 First railway: Frykstadbanan, between Frykstad and Klara Älvs, in the province of Värmland, converted to steam operation in 1855.
 First home-built automobile: a steam car built in 1891-92 by brothers Jöns and Anders Cederholm.
 First aeroplane flight: Frenchman George Legagneux flew his aircraft in Stockholm, 1909.
 First Volvo automobile: Volvo ÖV4, left production line on 14 April, 1927.
 First line of the Stockholm metro: Slussen to Hökarängen, opened October 1, 1950.
 First nuclear reactor: R1 at Royal Institute of Technology, started on July 13, 1954.
 First motorway: Malmö-Lund, 1950s.

Culture
 First official translation of the Bible: Gustav Vasa Bible, 1541
 First professional native actress: Beata Sabina Straas, 1737
 First theatre: Björngårdsteatern, 1640
 First professional woman photographer: Brita Sofia Hesselius, 1845
 First female film producer: Ebba Lindkvist, 1910

Business
 First casino: Casino Cosmopol in Sundsvall, opened on July 1, 2001

Titles and awards
First Miss Sweden to win Miss World Kicki Håkansson in 1951
First Miss Sweden to win Miss Universe Hillevi Rombin in 1955

Other 
 First professional woman swimmer Nancy Edberg, 1847

See also
 List of firsts in Finland

References

Firsts
Sweden